Newport on the Levee is a dining and attraction destination located on Third Street in Newport, Kentucky. It is located adjacent to the Purple People Bridge along the Ohio River and boasts views of downtown Cincinnati and the Ohio River. The Levee is only one block away from the East Row Historic District and the Monmouth Street Historic District. It is named after the levee that it rests on.

The area features annual community events like Live at the Levee, Light up the Levee, the Levee Wine Walk, Salute to Service 5K and many more. Some of the featured retail and attractions are the 20-screen AMC Theatres megaplex, DartRush Nerf Arena, GameWorks, Garra Fish Spa and much more. The main attraction at the Levee is the Newport Aquarium. There was a Barnes & Noble Booksellers but it closed in 2019.

Newport on the Levee stands on the site of the former Posey Flats apartments.

In 2017, AMC Newport on the Levee 20 Theater began a revitalization project with a lease extension for AMC through 2032.

Gallery

See also 

 Newport Aquarium

References

External links 
 Newport on the Levee

Buildings and structures in Campbell County, Kentucky
Newport, Kentucky
Shopping malls in Kentucky
Tourist attractions in Campbell County, Kentucky
Shopping malls established in 2001
2001 establishments in Kentucky
Lifestyle centers (retail)